The 1989 Holly Farms 400 was a NASCAR Winston Cup Series race that took place on October 15, 1989, at North Wilkesboro Speedway in North Wilkesboro, North Carolina.

Five of the most dominant drivers of the 1989 NASCAR Winston Cup Series season were Dale Earnhardt (average finish 10th place), Rusty Wallace (average finish 10th place), Mark Martin (average finish 11th place), Darrell Waltrip (average finish 12th place), and Bill Elliott (average finish of 13th place). The most dominant drivers in the NASCAR Winston Cup Series during the 1980s were Bill Elliott, Darrell Waltrip, Terry Labonte, Bobby Allison, and Dale Earnhardt.

This race took place two days before the Great 1989 San Francisco Earthquake.

Background
During the 1980s, North Wilkesboro Speedway was noticeably lagging behind other speedways on the NASCAR circuit, but the fans were more interested in the great racing action between the legendary drivers. Enoch's focus was more on the fans' enjoyment rather than on building large suites and new facilities. Attendance and total purse for races at the track were the lowest in NASCAR, but the events continued to sell out and attract more fans each year.

In the 1981 Northwestern Bank 400, Dave Marcis, driving an unpainted car, won the pole with a lap record of 19.483 sec / 115.485 mph on the newly repaved track. The lap was 0.241 seconds faster than the previous record set by Dale Earnhardt one year earlier. A 22-year-old newcomer, Mark Martin, made his NASCAR Cup Series debut with a quick qualifying run, starting fifth. But he ended up dropping out 166 laps into the race with rear end problems and finished 27th. Bobby Allison was up front, leading the most laps with 186. Marcis stayed up front and led 123 laps but fell off the pace late in the race when his tires wore out. Richard Petty took the lead and led the final 62 laps for his 194th career win. This was Petty's 15th and final win at North Wilkesboro, the most Cup wins at the track. It was also Petty's 107th and final win on a short track. The top five finishers behind Petty were Allison, Darrell Waltrip, Marcis, and Harry Gant.

Darrell Waltrip dominated the Holly Farms 400 of 1981. He started on the pole, leading 318. He lapped the field on the way to the win, beginning a streak of five straight wins at the track. Bobby Allison finished second, one lap down after leading 76 laps. Other leaders in the race were Jody Ridley leading four laps, Dave Marcis with one lap, and Richard Petty with one.

The Northwestern Bank 400 of 1982 was ESPN's first broadcast at North Wilkesboro Speedway. Bob Jenkins and Ned Jarrett called the race, with Ron Kendrick as the pit reporter. They broadcast every North Wilkesboro race afterward until the final race there in the fall of 1996. Bobby Hillin Jr., at 17 years old, made his first career start and set the record for the youngest driver (A 1998 rule change raised the minimum age in NASCAR to 18, meaning this record is unlikely to be broken) to start a NASCAR Winston Cup race. Darrell Waltrip won the race from the pole, leading 345 laps.

The 1982 Holly Farms 400 was a total domination by Darrell Waltrip and the Junior Johnson team. Waltrip started the weekend by gaining his third straight pole at the track with a qualifying lap of 19.761 sec / 113.860 mph. He led 329 laps in the race. Bobby Allison was the only driver who could stay close to the No. 11 team. As the only other leader in the race, Allison led 71 laps but was forced out by engine problems after 141 laps. Only Waltrip and Harry Gant finished the race on the lead lap. It was Waltrip's third straight NASCAR Cup Series win at North Wilkesboro.

In the spring of 1983, NASCAR ran its first Busch race at North Wilkesboro. Tommy Ellis won the pole with a qualifying speed of 116.692 mph. Ellis led the first 15 laps before being passed by Butch Lindley. Sam Ard got the lead from Lindley on Lap 34 and led the rest of the 200-lap race. Only ten of the 23 cars finished the race. That fall, Phil Parsons won the pole for the second Busch race. Jack Ingram led a race-high 126 laps, but Tommy Ellis took the win. Only one event was held in 1984, with Sam Ard winning his final Busch race. Tommy Houston won the pole in 1985 for the last Busch race, with Jack Ingram taking the win.

Darrell Waltrip and Junior Johnson enjoyed a big win in the 1983 Holly Farms 400. It was Waltrip's fifth straight win at the track and Johnson's 100th career NASCAR Cup Series win as an owner, which just happened to take place at his home track within ten miles of his home and farm. Waltrip got the pole and led 252 laps on the way to victory. Dale Earnhardt was runner-up in the race with 134 laps out front.

The Northwestern Bank 400 of 1984 was dominated by Ricky Rudd, who got the pole and led 290 laps. But at the end of the race, Tim Richmond had a better pit stop to beat Ricky Rudd out of the win. Richmond's victory broke Darrell Waltrip's five-race winning streak at North Wilkesboro.

In the 1986 First Union 400, Geoffrey Bodine started on the pole. On Lap 85, Trevor Boys crashed out of the race and blocked the entrance to Pit Road, but no caution flag was thrown. Instead, a wrecker was sent out on the bottom of the track to haul Boys out of the way under green-flag conditions. Dale Earnhardt won the race and led 195 laps, followed by Ricky Rudd in second place with 102.

The Holly Farms 400 of 1988 was a rough race. Ricky Rudd led 154 laps, and Dale Earnhardt led 107. A beating and banging match started between them, and NASCAR sent them both to the rear of the field with less than 40 laps to go. For the remainder of the race, they continued to beat and bang on each other. On the last lap, Geoffrey Bodine gave Rusty Wallace a shot and drove around him in Turn One. But when the two got around to Turn Three, Wallace returned the shot and passed Bodine for the win.

The 1989 First Union 400 was the first NASCAR Cup Series race for Goodyear radial tires. Dale Earnhardt won the race on the Goodyear tires after Rusty Wallace grabbed the pole on Hoosier bias ply tires. Earnhardt led 296 out of 400 laps. In the end, Earnhardt and Alan Kulwicki battled it out hard for the last couple of laps until Kulwicki ran up the track trying to pass Earnhardt on the outside with four laps left.

Race report
The race was scheduled for October 1, but rain persisted and a two-week postponement resulted. This race is memorable for a last-lap incident between leader Dale Earnhardt and second-place driver Ricky Rudd. Dale should have been content with second place but Ricky Rudd showed no mercy and gave Earnhardt a hard time in the closing laps of the race.

There were no time trials because the inclement weather on the race track washed out qualifying, so the field lined up according to the Winston Cup Series owners' points standings prior to Charlotte. Four hundred laps were completed on a paved oval track spanning . The race featured 11 cautions for 60 laps, the final yellow waved for a spin by Bobby Hillin Jr. in Turn 2. No serious accidents occurred, although an accident involving both Richard and Kyle Petty and Hut Stricklin saw The King get his right-side wheels in the air, but at a reduced speed. Dale Earnhardt was the clear dominator, as only Mark Martin (51 laps) led more than 5 laps. The final restart was on Lap 398, as Earnhardt led Rudd, Geoff Bodine, Terry Labonte, and Martin to the green. Hillin spun again in Turn 1, but left the scene quickly without prompting a yellow flag. Rudd pressured Earnhardt relentlessly, and as Dale got loose exiting Turn 4 coming to the white flag, Rudd got alongside the #3. As they entered Turn 1 Earnhardt tried to keep a tight line through the corner, while in the outside line, and as he came closer to the ideal line Rudd's car appeared to push slightly, and the ensuing contact spun both drivers around. This handed the lead to a surprised but elated Bodine, who won his 7th Winston Cup race (all for Hendrick Motorsports).

The last-lap contact also produced one of the most memorable broadcasting quotes in NASCAR history. ESPN's Bob Jenkins, accompanied by former champions Ned Jarrett and Benny Parsons, said the following:

Richard Petty would get his 15th (and final) last place finish here (in a Pontiac car) with his son finishing only slightly ahead of him in 31st place. Thirty-four thousand people would attend a race where Geoffrey Bodine (in his Chevrolet Lumina) would defeat Mark Martin (in his Ford Thunderbird) by a margin of three seconds. Darrell Waltrip and Kyle Petty would eventually get 16 last-place finishes each that would allow them to surpass Richard Petty on the "all-time last place finishers' list."

The points leader before and after this race was Rusty Wallace; he had to only finish 18th or better to win the title so his driving style for the race was extremely conservative. Everyone was eligible for NASCAR Winston Cup points back then; with the first-place winner receiving 180 points and the last-place finisher receiving a meager 67 points.

Notable crew chiefs who actively participated in this race were Jimmy Fennig, Andy Petree, Larry McReynolds, Jeff Hammond, Bud Moore, Tim Brewer, Buddy Parrott, Harry Hyde, Robin Pemberton, and Kirk Shelmerdine.

Qualifying

Failed to qualify: Dale Fischlein, Joe Ruttman, James Hylton

Finishing order

 Geoffrey Bodine (No. 5)
 Mark Martin (No. 6)
 Terry Labonte (No. 11)
 Harry Gant (No. 33)
 Morgan Shepherd  (No. 75)
 Bill Elliott (No. 9)
 Rusty Wallace (No. 27)
 Ernie Irvan (No. 2)
 Ricky Rudd (No. 26)
 Dale Earnhardt† (No. 3)
 Alan Kulwicki† (No. 7)
 Dick Trickle† (No. 84)
 Ken Schrader (No. 25)
 Dave Marcis (No. 71)
 Bobby Hillin Jr. (No. 8)
 Tommy Ellis (No. 21)
 Brett Bodine (No. 15)
 Jimmy Spencer (No. 88)
 Sterling Marlin (No. 94)
 Darrell Waltrip (No. 17)
 Davey Allison† (No. 28)
 Jimmy Means (No. 52)
 Michael Waltrip (No. 30)
 Larry Pearson (No. 16)
 Lake Speed (No. 83)
 Derrike Cope (No. 10)
 Dale Jarrett* (No. 29)
 Phil Parsons* (No. 55)
 Rick Wilson* (No. 4)
 Hut Stricklin (No. 57)
 Kyle Petty* (No. 42)
 Richard Petty* (No. 43)

* Driver failed to finish race
† Driver is deceased

Timeline
Section reference: 
 Start of race: Dale Earnhardt has the pole position.
 Lap 15: First caution of the event, ended on lap 18.
 Lap 30: Mark Martin took over the lead from Dale Earnhardt.
 Lap 71: Second caution of the event, ended on lap 76.
 Lap 78: Dale Earnhardt took over the lead from Mark Martin.
 Lap 89: Third caution of the event, ended on lap 99.
 Lap 117: Fourth caution of the event, ended on lap 121.
 Lap 118: Ernie Irvan took over the lead from Dale Earnhardt.
 Lap 123: Dale Earnhardt took over the lead from Ernie Irvan.
 Lap 124: Richard Petty had a terminal crash while his son Kyle developed problems with his vehicle's distributor.
 Lap 128: Fifth caution of the event, ended on lap 131.
 Lap 181: Rick Wilson's vehicle had a faulty ignition; causing him to leave the race.
 Lap 184: Sixth caution of the event, ended on lap 189.
 Lap 199: Phil Parsons had a terminal crash; forcing him to exit the race early.
 Lap 203: Seventh caution of the event, ended on lap 211.
 Lap 218: Dale Jarrett's vehicle overheated; ending his race weekend prematurely.
 Lap 277: Eighth caution of the event, ended on lap 280.
 Lap 309: Ninth caution of the event, ended on lap 312.
 Lap 310: Mark Martin took over the lead from Ernie Irvan.
 Lap 313: Dale Earnhardt took over the lead from Mark Martin.
 Lap 368: Tenth caution of the event, ended on lap 371.
 Lap 395: Eleventh caution of the event, ended on lap 397.
 Lap 400: Geoffrey Bodine took over the lead from Dale Earnhardt.
 Finish: Geoffrey Bodine won the race.

Standings after the race

References

Holly Farms 400
Holly Farms 400
NASCAR races at North Wilkesboro Speedway